The Rance Tidal Power Station is a tidal power station located on the estuary of the Rance River in Brittany, France.

Opened in 1966 as the world's first tidal power station, it is currently operated by Électricité de France and was for 45 years the largest tidal power station in the world by installed capacity until the South Korean Sihwa Lake Tidal Power Station surpassed it in 2011.

Its 24 turbines reach peak output at 240 megawatts (MW) and average 57 MW, a capacity factor of approximately 24%. At an annual output of approximately 500 GWh (491 GWh in 2009, 523 GWh in 2010), it supplies 0.12% of the power demand of France. The power density is of the order of 2.6 W/m2. The cost of electricity production is estimated at /kWh.

History 

An early attempt to build a tidal power plant was made at Aber Wrac'h in the Finistère in 1925, but due to insufficient finance, it was abandoned in 1930. Plans for this plant served as the draft for follow-on work. Use of tidal energy is not an entirely new concept, since tidal mills have long existed in areas exposed to tides, particularly along the Rance.

The idea of constructing a tidal power plant on the Rance dates to Gerard Boisnoer in 1921. The first studies which envisaged a tidal plant on the Rance were done by the Society for the Study of Utilization of the Tides in 1943. Nevertheless, work did not actually commence until 1961. Albert Caquot, the visionary engineer, was instrumental in the construction of the dam, designing an enclosure in order to protect the construction site from the ocean tides and the strong streams. Construction necessitated draining the area where the plant was to be built, which required construction of two dams which took two years. Construction of the plant commenced on 20 July 1963, while the Rance was entirely blocked by the two dams.

Construction took three years and was completed in 1966. Charles de Gaulle, then President of France, inaugurated the plant on 26 November of the same year. Inauguration of the road crossing the plant took place on 1 July 1967, and connection of the plant to the French National Power Grid was carried out on 4 December 1967. In total, the plant cost ₣620 million (approximately €94.5 million). It took almost 20 years for the La Rance to pay for itself.

Assessments 
In spite of the high development cost of the project, the costs have now been recovered, and electricity production costs are lower than that of nuclear power generation (1.8 ¢/kWh versus 2.5 ¢/kWh for nuclear). However, the capacity factor of the plant is 28%, lower than 85–90% for nuclear power.

Environmental impact 
The barrage has caused progressive silting of the Rance ecosystem. Sand-eels and plaice have disappeared, though sea bass and cuttlefish have returned to the river. By definition, tides still flow in the estuary and the operator, EDF, endeavours to adjust their level to minimize the biological impact.

Tourist attraction 
The facility attracted approximately 40,000 visitors in 2011. A lock for navigation at the west end of the dam allows the passage of 1,600-tonne vessels between the English Channel and the Rance. Departmental road 168 crosses the dam and allows vehicles to travel between Dinard and Saint-Malo. There is a drawbridge where the road crosses the lock which is raised to allow larger vessels to pass. The Rance estuary is the first part of the inland waterway from the English Channel to the Bay of Biscay via the Canal d'Ille-et-Rance and the river Vilaine.

See also 

 List of tidal power stations
 List of largest power stations in the world
 Renewable energy in France

References

External links 

 University of Strathclyde Rance Project (case study) 
 EDF website

Energy infrastructure completed in 1963
Tidal power stations in France
Coastal construction
Buildings and structures in Ille-et-Vilaine
Saint-Malo
Tidal barrages
Électricité de France
Tourist attractions in Ille-et-Vilaine
Articles containing video clips
1963 establishments in France
20th-century architecture in France